Monymusk Parish Church (also known as the Church of the Blessed Mary) is located in Monymusk, Aberdeenshire, Scotland. It is of Church of Scotland denomination. Now Category A listed, a structure on the site has existed since at least the late 12th or early 13th century, but it was a site of worship even before that.

Originally Monymusk Priory, today's structure has been altered several times, including post-Reformation (around 1690), and in 1822, 1851 and 1921, when Alexander Marshall Mackenzie performed a partial restoration.

The clock face dates to 1865, and its Mowat bell 1748.

There are monuments to Forbes-Leslie of Abersnithick and Sir Archibald Grant and his relatives.

References

External links

Churches in Aberdeenshire
19th-century establishments in Scotland
19th-century churches in the United Kingdom
Listed churches in Scotland
19th-century Church of Scotland church buildings